Harry Potter and the Philosopher's Stone (released in the United States, India and the Philippines as Harry Potter and the Sorcerer's Stone) is a 2001 fantasy film directed by Chris Columbus and produced by David Heyman, from a screenplay by Steve Kloves, based on the 1997 novel of the same name by J. K. Rowling. It is the first instalment in the Harry Potter film series. The film stars Daniel Radcliffe as Harry Potter, with Rupert Grint as Ron Weasley, and Emma Watson as Hermione Granger. Its story follows Harry's first year at Hogwarts School of Witchcraft and Wizardry as he discovers that he is a famous wizard and begins his formal wizarding education.

Warner Bros. Pictures bought the film rights to the book in 1999 for a reported £1 million ($1.65 million). Production began in the United Kingdom in 2000, with Chris Columbus being chosen to create the film from a short list of directors that included Steven Spielberg and Rob Reiner. Rowling insisted that the entire cast be British and Irish, with the three leads chosen in August 2000 following open casting calls. The film was shot at Leavesden Film Studios and historic buildings around the United Kingdom, from September 2000 to March 2001.

The film was released to cinemas in the United Kingdom and Ireland on 10 and 11 November 2001 for two days of previews. It opened on 16 November in the United States, Canada, and Taiwan as well as officially in the United Kingdom and Ireland. It became a critical and commercial success, grossing $974 million at the box office worldwide during its initial run, and over $1 billion with subsequent re-releases. It became the highest-grossing film of 2001 and the second-highest-grossing film at the time. The film was nominated for many awards, including Academy Awards for Best Original Score, Best Art Direction and Best Costume Design. It was followed by seven sequels, beginning with Harry Potter and the Chamber of Secrets in 2002 and ending with Harry Potter and the Deathly Hallows – Part 2 in 2011.

Plot
 

Late one night, Albus Dumbledore and Minerva McGonagall, professors at Hogwarts School of Witchcraft and Wizardry, along with groundskeeper Rubeus Hagrid, deliver an orphaned infant wizard named Harry Potter to his Muggle aunt and uncle, Petunia and Vernon Dursley, his only living relatives.

Ten years later, just before Harry's eleventh birthday, owls begin delivering letters addressed to him. When the abusive Dursleys adamantly refuse to allow Harry to open any and flee to an island hut, Hagrid arrives to personally deliver Harry's letter of acceptance to Hogwarts. Hagrid also reveals that Harry's parents, James and Lily, were killed by a dark wizard named Lord Voldemort. The killing curse that Voldemort had cast towards Harry rebounded, destroying Voldemort's body and giving Harry his lightning-bolt scar. Hagrid then takes Harry to Diagon Alley for school supplies and gives him a pet snowy owl whom he names Hedwig. Harry buys a wand that is connected to Voldemort's own wand.

At King's Cross station, Harry boards the Hogwarts Express train, and meets fellow students Ron Weasley and Hermione Granger during the journey. Arriving at Hogwarts, Harry also meets Draco Malfoy, who is from a wealthy wizard family; the two immediately form a rivalry. The students assemble in the Great Hall where the Sorting Hat sorts the first-years into four respective houses: Gryffindor, Hufflepuff, Ravenclaw, and Slytherin. Harry is placed into Gryffindor alongside Ron and Hermione, while Draco is placed into Slytherin, a house noted for dark wizards.

As he studies magic, Harry learns more about his parents and Voldemort, and his natural talent for broomstick flying gets him recruited for Gryffindor's Quidditch team as the youngest Seeker in a century. While returning to the Gryffindor common room, the staircases change paths, leading Harry, Ron, and Hermione to the third floor, which is forbidden to students. There they discover a giant three-headed dog named Fluffy. On Halloween, Ron insults Hermione after she shows off in Charms class; upset, she spends the afternoon crying in the girls' bathroom. That evening, a giant marauding troll enters it, but Harry and Ron save Hermione, and the three make up and become close friends after Hermione takes the blame for the incident by claiming she went looking for the troll.

The trio discover that Fluffy is guarding the philosopher's stone, a magical object that can turn metal into gold and produce an immortality elixir. Harry suspects that Potions teacher and head of Slytherin House, Severus Snape, wants the stone to return Voldemort to physical form. When Hagrid accidentally reveals that music puts Fluffy asleep, Harry, Ron and Hermione decide to find the stone before Snape. Fluffy is already asleep, but the trio face other barriers, including a deadly plant called Devil's Snare, a room filled with aggressive flying keys, and a giant chess game that knocks out Ron.

After overcoming the barriers, Harry encounters Defence Against the Dark Arts teacher Quirinus Quirrell who wants the stone; Snape had figured it out and had been protecting Harry. Quirrell removes his turban to reveal a weakened Voldemort living on the back of his head. Dumbledore's protective enchantment places the stone in Harry's possession. Voldemort attempts to bargain the stone from Harry in exchange for resurrecting his parents, but Harry sees through his trick and refuses. Quirrell attempts to kill Harry. When Harry touches Quirrell's skin, it burns Quirrell, reducing him to ashes. Voldemort's soul rises from the pile and escapes, knocking out Harry as it passes through him.

Harry recovers in the school infirmary. Dumbledore tells him the stone has been destroyed to prevent misuse, and that Ron and Hermione are safe. He also reveals how Harry defeated Quirrell: when Lily died to save Harry, a love-based protection against Voldemort was placed on him. Harry, Ron, and Hermione are rewarded with house points for their heroism, tying Gryffindor for first place with Slytherin. Dumbledore then awards ten points to their housemate Neville Longbottom for having had the courage to stand up to the trio, granting Gryffindor the House Cup. Harry returns to the Dursleys for the summer, happy to finally have a real home at Hogwarts.

Cast

 Daniel Radcliffe as Harry Potter: An 11-year-old orphan living with his unwelcoming aunt, uncle, and cousin, who learns of his own fame as a wizard known to have survived his parents' murder at the hands of the dark wizard Lord Voldemort as an infant when he is accepted to Hogwarts School of Witchcraft and Wizardry. Columbus had wanted Radcliffe for the role since he saw him in the BBC's production of David Copperfield, before the open casting sessions had taken place, but had been told by casting director Susan Figgis that Radcliffe's protective parents would not allow their son to take the part. Columbus explained that his persistence in giving Radcliffe the role was responsible for Figgis' resignation. Radcliffe was asked to audition in 2000, when Heyman and Kloves met him and his parents at a production of Stones in His Pockets in London. Heyman and Columbus successfully managed to convince Radcliffe's parents that their son would be protected from media intrusion, and they agreed to let him play Harry. Rowling approved of Radcliffe's casting, stating that "having seen [his] screen test I don't think Chris Columbus could have found a better Harry." Radcliffe was reportedly paid £1 million for the film, although he felt the fee was "not that important" to him. William Moseley, who was later cast as Peter Pevensie in The Chronicles of Narnia series, also auditioned for the role. The Saunders triplets appear as Harry as a baby.
 Rupert Grint as Ron Weasley: Harry's best friend at Hogwarts and a younger member of the Weasley wizarding family. A fan of the series, Grint decided he would be perfect for the part "because [he has] ginger hair". Having seen a Newsround report about the open casting he sent in a video of himself rapping about how he wished to receive the part. His attempt was successful as the casting team asked for a meeting with him. Thomas Brodie-Sangster auditioned for the role but was rejected.
 Emma Watson as Hermione Granger: Harry's other best friend and the trio's brains. Watson's Oxford theatre teacher passed her name on to the casting agents and she had to do over five interviews before she got the part. Watson took her audition seriously, but "never really thought [she] had any chance of getting the role." The producers were impressed by Watson's self-confidence and she outperformed the thousands of other girls who had applied. 
 John Cleese as Nearly Headless Nick: The ghost of Gryffindor House.
 Robbie Coltrane as Rubeus Hagrid: A half-giant and Hogwarts' gamekeeper. Coltrane was one of the two actors Rowling wanted most, along with Smith as McGonagall. Coltrane, who was already a fan of the books, prepared for the role by discussing Hagrid's past and future with Rowling. According to Figgis, Robin Williams was interested in participating in the film, but was turned down for the Hagrid role because of the "strictly British and Irish only" rule which Columbus was determined to maintain.
 Warwick Davis as Filius Flitwick: The Charms Master and head of Ravenclaw House. Davis also plays two other roles in the film: the Goblin Head Teller at Gringotts, and dubs the voice of Griphook, who is embodied by Verne Troyer.
 Richard Griffiths as Vernon Dursley: Harry's Muggle uncle.
 Richard Harris as Albus Dumbledore: Hogwarts' Headmaster and one of the most famous and powerful wizards of all time. Harris initially rejected the role, only to reverse his decision after his granddaughter stated she would never speak to him again if he did not take it. Patrick McGoohan was initially offered the role, and showed interest, but declined due to health issues. Sean Connery was also offered the role but turned it down because he was not interested in the film's subject matter. 
 Ian Hart as Quirinus Quirrell: The stuttering Defence Against the Dark Arts teacher at Hogwarts. David Thewlis auditioned for the part; he would later be cast as Remus Lupin in Harry Potter and the Prisoner of Azkaban. Hart also voiced Lord Voldemort, while Richard Bremmer provided his physical appearance and portrayed him as a hooded figure during a flashback.
 John Hurt as Mr. Ollivander: a highly regarded wandmaker and the owner of Ollivanders.
 Alan Rickman as Severus Snape: The Potions Master and head of Slytherin House. Tim Roth was the original choice for the role, but he turned it down for Planet of the Apes.
 Fiona Shaw as Petunia Dursley: Harry's Muggle aunt.
 Maggie Smith as Minerva McGonagall: The Deputy Headmistress, head of Gryffindor and transfiguration teacher at Hogwarts. Smith was one of the two actors Rowling wanted most, along with Coltrane as Hagrid.
 Julie Walters as Molly Weasley: Ron's mother. She shows Harry how to get to Platform .

Additionally, Zoë Wanamaker appears as Madame Hooch, Hogwarts' flying instructor; Tom Felton portrays Draco Malfoy, a student in Slytherin and Harry's rival; before being cast as Draco, Felton auditioned for the roles of Harry and Ron. Harry Melling plays Dudley Dursley, Harry's cousin; and David Bradley appears as Argus Filch, Hogwarts' caretaker. Matthew Lewis, Devon Murray and Alfred Enoch portray Neville Longbottom, Seamus Finnigan and Dean Thomas respectively, three first year students in Gryffindor; James and Oliver Phelps play twins Fred and George Weasley, Ron's brothers, while Chris Rankin appears as his other brother Percy, a Gryffindor prefect, and Bonnie Wright appears as Ron's sister Ginny. Sean Biggerstaff portrays Oliver Wood, the Keeper of the Gryffindor Quidditch team; Jamie Waylett and Joshua Herdman play Crabbe and Goyle, Malfoy's minions; and Leslie Phillips voices the Sorting Hat. Derek Deadman plays Tom, innkeeper of The Leaky Cauldron; and Elizabeth Spriggs appears as the Fat Lady, a painting at Hogwarts.

Production

Development
In 1997, producer David Heyman searched for a children's book that could be adapted into a well-received film. He had planned to produce Diana Wynne Jones' novel The Ogre Downstairs, but his plans fell through. His staff at Heyday Films then suggested Harry Potter and the Philosopher's Stone, which his assistant believed was "a cool idea." Heyman pitched the idea to Warner Bros. and in 1999, Rowling sold the company the rights to the first four Harry Potter books for a reported £1million. A demand Rowling made was for Heyman to keep the cast strictly British and Irish; the latter's case has Richard Harris as Dumbledore and Fiona Shaw as Petunia Dursley, and not to cast foreign actors unless absolutely necessary, like casting of French and Eastern European actors in Harry Potter and the Goblet of Fire (2005) where characters from the book are specified as such. Rowling was hesitant to sell the rights because she "didn't want to give them control over the rest of the story" by selling the rights to the characters, which would have enabled Warner Bros. to make non-author-written sequels.

Although Steven Spielberg initially negotiated to direct the film, he declined the offer. Spielberg reportedly wanted the adaptation to be an animated film, with American actor Haley Joel Osment to provide Harry Potter's voice, or a film that incorporated elements from subsequent books as well. Spielberg contended that, in his opinion, it was like "shooting ducks in a barrel. It's just a slam dunk. It's just like withdrawing a billion dollars and putting it into your personal bank accounts. There's no challenge." Rowling maintains that she had no role in choosing directors for the films and that "[a]nyone who thinks I could (or would) have 'veto-ed'  him [Spielberg] needs their Quick-Quotes Quill serviced." Heyman recalled that Spielberg decided to direct A.I. Artificial Intelligence instead.

After Spielberg left, talks began with other directors, including Chris Columbus, Terry Gilliam, Jonathan Demme, Mike Newell (who would later direct the fourth film), Alan Parker, Wolfgang Petersen, Rob Reiner, Ivan Reitman, Tim Robbins, Brad Silberling, M. Night Shyamalan and Peter Weir. Petersen and Reiner both pulled out of the running in March 2000, and the choice was narrowed down to Silberling, Columbus, Parker and Gilliam. Rowling's first choice director was Terry Gilliam, but Warner Bros. chose Columbus, citing his work on other family films such as Home Alone (1990) and Mrs. Doubtfire (1993) as influences for their decision. Columbus had become a fan of the book series after his daughter persuaded him to read the first three books, leading him to call his agent to arrange a meeting at Warner Bros. to direct the film. When his agent told him that at least 25 other directors were eager to helm the project, Columbus requested his agent to secure his meeting to be the last one so he could give a "lasting impression" and be the studio's "freshest person in their memory". During two weeks of waiting, Columbus wrote a 130-page director's version of the screenplay to explain his vision for the film's tone. The day of his meeting with Warner executives including Alan F. Horn, Columbus delivered an "impassioned 45-minute talk" and showed them his annotated script. Weeks later, the studio notified Columbus that he had gotten the job and sent him to Scotland to meet with Rowling and Heyman. Columbus pitched his vision of the film for two hours, stating that he wanted the Muggle scenes "to be bleak and dreary" but those set in the wizarding world "to be steeped in color, mood, and detail." He took inspiration from David Lean's adaptations of Great Expectations (1946) and Oliver Twist (1948), wishing to use "that sort of darkness, that sort of edge, that quality to the cinematography," while being further inspired by the colour designs from Oliver! (1968) and The Godfather (1972).

Steve Kloves was selected to write the screenplay. He described adapting the book as "tough", as it did not "lend itself to adaptation as well as the next two books." Kloves often received synopses of books proposed as film adaptations from Warner Bros., which he "almost never read", but Harry Potter jumped out at him. He went out and bought the book, and became an instant fan of the series. When speaking to Warner Bros., he stated that the film had to be British, and had to be true to the characters. Kloves was nervous when he first met Rowling as he did not want her to think he was going to "[destroy] her baby." Rowling admitted that she "was really ready to hate this Steve Kloves," but recalled her initial meeting with him: "The first time I met him, he said to me, 'You know who my favourite character is?' And I thought, You're gonna say Ron. I know you're gonna say Ron. But he said 'Hermione.' And I just kind of melted." Rowling received a large amount of creative control, an arrangement that Columbus did not mind.

Warner Bros. had initially planned to release the film over 4 July 2001 weekend, making for such a short production window that several proposed directors pulled themselves out of the running. Due to time constraints, the date was put back to 16 November 2001.

Casting
Rowling insisted that the cast be kept British. Susie Figgis was appointed as casting director, working with both Columbus and Rowling in auditioning the lead roles of Harry, Ron and Hermione. Open casting calls were held for the main three roles, with only British children being considered. The principal auditions took place in three parts, with those auditioning having to read a page from the novel, then to improvise a scene of the students' arrival at Hogwarts, and finally to read several pages from the script in front of Columbus. Scenes from Columbus' script for the Young Sherlock Holmes (1985) were also used in auditions. On 11 July 2000, Figgis left the production, complaining that Columbus did not consider any of the thousands of children they had auditioned "worthy". By August 2000, Alan Rickman and Richard Harris were in final talks to play Severus Snape and Albus Dumbledore, respectively, and were confirmed later that month. On 14 August 2000, Rowling's favourites Maggie Smith and Robbie Coltrane were cast as Minerva McGonagall and Rubeus Hagrid. On 21 August 2000, Daniel Radcliffe and newcomers Rupert Grint and Emma Watson were selected to play Harry Potter, Ron Weasley and Hermione Granger, respectively. In November 2000, Julie Walters and John Cleese joined the cast as Molly Weasley and Nearly-Headless Nick, respectively.

Filming

Two British film industry officials requested that the film be shot in the United Kingdom, offering their assistance in securing filming locations, the use of Leavesden Film Studios, as well as changing the UK's child labour laws (adding a small number of working hours per week and making the timing of on-set classes more flexible). Warner Bros. accepted their proposal. Principal photography began on 29 September 2000 at Leavesden Film Studios. Filming at the North Yorkshire's Goathland railway station took place on 2 October 2000. Canterbury Cathedral and Scotland's Inverailort Castle were both touted as possible locations for Hogwarts; Canterbury rejected Warner Bros. proposal due to concerns about the film's "pagan" theme. Alnwick Castle and Gloucester Cathedral were eventually selected as the principal locations for Hogwarts, with some scenes also being filmed at Harrow School. Other Hogwarts scenes were filmed in Durham Cathedral over a two-week period; these included shots of the corridors and some classroom scenes. Oxford University's Divinity School served as the Hogwarts Hospital Wing, and Duke Humfrey's Library, part of the Bodleian, was used as the Hogwarts Library. Filming for Privet Drive took place on Picket Post Close in Bracknell, Berkshire. Filming in the street took two days instead of the planned single day, so payments to the street's residents were correspondingly increased. For all the subsequent film's scenes set in Privet Drive, filming took place on a constructed set in Leavesden Film Studios, which proved to be cheaper than filming on location. London's Australia House was selected as the location for Gringotts Wizarding Bank, while Christ Church, Oxford was the location for the Hogwarts trophy room. London Zoo was used as the location for the scene in which Harry accidentally sets a snake on Dudley, with King's Cross Station also being used as the book specifies. Filming concluded on 23 March 2001, with final work being done in July 2001.

Because the American title was different, all scenes that mention the philosopher's stone by name had to be shot twice, once with the actors saying "philosopher's" and once with "sorcerer's". The children filmed for four hours and then did three hours of schoolwork. They developed a liking for fake facial injuries from the makeup staff. Radcliffe was initially meant to wear green contact lenses as his eyes are blue, and not green like Harry's, but the lenses gave Radcliffe extreme irritation. Upon consultation with Rowling, it was agreed that Harry could have blue eyes.

Design and special effects
Judianna Makovsky served as the costume designer. She re-designed the Quidditch robes, having initially planned to use those shown on the cover of the American book, but deemed them "a mess." Instead, she dressed the Quidditch players in "preppie sweaters, 19th-century fencing breeches and arm guards." Production designer Stuart Craig built the sets at Leavesden Studios, including Hogwarts Great Hall, basing it on many English cathedrals. Although originally asked to use an existing old street to film the Diagon Alley scenes, Craig decided to build his own set, comprising Tudor, Georgian and Queen Anne architecture.

Columbus originally planned to use both animatronics and CGI animation to create the magical creatures, including Fluffy. Nick Dudman, who worked on Star Wars: Episode I – The Phantom Menace, was given the task of creating the needed prosthetics, with Jim Henson's Creature Shop providing creature effects. John Coppinger stated that the magical creatures that needed to be created had to be designed multiple times. The film features nearly 600 special effects shots, involving numerous companies. Industrial Light & Magic created Lord Voldemort's face on the back of Quirrell, Rhythm & Hues animated Norbert (Hagrid's baby dragon); and Sony Pictures Imageworks produced the Quidditch scenes.

Music

John Williams was selected to compose the score, having previously collaborated with Chris Columbus for Home Alone and Home Alone 2: Lost in New York. Williams composed the score at his homes in Los Angeles and Tanglewood before recording it in London in September 2001. One of the main themes is entitled "Hedwig's Theme"; Williams retained it for his finished score as "everyone seemed to like it," and it became a recurring theme throughout the series. James Horner was the first choice to compose the score but turned it down. The soundtrack album was released on 30 October 2001 in CD format.

Differences from the book

Columbus repeatedly checked with Rowling to make sure he was getting minor details correct. Kloves described the film as being "really faithful" to the book. He added dialogue, of which Rowling approved. One of the lines originally included had to be removed after Rowling told him that it would directly contradict an event in the then-unreleased fifth Harry Potter novel Harry Potter and the Order of the Phoenix.

Several minor characters have been removed from the film version, most prominently Peeves the poltergeist. Actor Rik Mayall was cast in the role, but his scenes were ultimately cut from the film and never released. The book's first chapter, told from the viewpoint of Vernon and Petunia Dursley, is absent from the film. Harry and Draco's first encounter in Madam Malkin's robe shop and the midnight duel are not in the film. In the film, the responsibility of taking Norbert away is given to Dumbledore, while in the book, Harry and Hermione have to bring him by hand to Charlie Weasley's friends. This necessitated a change in the detention plotline: in the book, Filch catches Harry and Hermione leaving the Astronomy Tower and puts them in detention with Neville and Malfoy, while in the film, all three protagonists receive detention after Malfoy finds them in Hagrid's hut after hours. According to Kloves, this was "the one part of the book that [Rowling] felt easily could be changed". The Quidditch pitch is altered from a traditional stadium to an open field circled by spectator towers.

The book's timeline is not enforced in the film. In the book, Harry's eleventh birthday is in 1991. On the film set for 4 Privet Drive, Dudley's certificates from primary school bear the year 2001.

Distribution

Marketing
The first teaser poster was released on 1 December 2000. The first teaser trailer was released via satellite on 2 March 2001 and debuted in cinemas with the release of See Spot Run. On 29 June 2001, a new trailer was released with the debut of A.I. Artificial Intelligence. A video game based on the film was released on 15 November 2001 by Electronic Arts for several consoles. A port for the game, for the GameCube, PlayStation 2 and Xbox, was released in 2003. Mattel won the rights to produce toys based on the film, to be sold exclusively through Warner Brothers' stores. Hasbro also produced products, including confectionery products based on those from the series. Warner Bros. signed a deal worth US$150million with Coca-Cola to promote the film, although some pegged the deal at $40 million-$50 million worldwide for the movie. Lego produced a series of sets based on buildings and scenes from the film, as well as a Lego Creator video game.

Theatrical release
Harry Potter and the Philosopher's Stone had its world premiere at the Odeon Leicester Square in London on 4 November 2001, with the cinema arranged to resemble Hogwarts School.

The film had previews in the United Kingdom on 1,137 screens at 491 theatres on 10 and 11 November 2001. It officially opened on 16 November 2001 on 1,168 screens at 507 theatres in the United Kingdom and Ireland; in 3,672 theatres in the United States and Canada. It was the widest release at the time in the UK and the US.

Home media
Harry Potter and the Philosopher's Stone was first released on VHS and DVD on 11 May 2002 in the UK and 28 May 2002 in the US. 
Between May and June 2002, the film sold 10million copies, almost 60% of which were DVD sales. It would go on to make $19.1 million in rentals, surpassing The Fast and the Furious for having the largest DVD rentals.

In December 2009, a 4-disc "Ultimate Edition" was released, with seven minutes of deleted scenes added back in, the feature-length special Creating the World of Harry Potter Part 1: The Magic Begins, and a 48-page hardcover booklet. The extended version has a running time of about 159 minutes, which had previously been shown during certain television airings. The film was re-released on DVD as part of the 8-disc Harry Potter: The Complete 8-Film Collection in November 2011, and on Blu-ray as part of the 31-disc Hogwarts Collection in April 2014. It was released on 4K Blu-ray as part of the 16-disc Harry Potter: 8-Film Collection in November 2017.

Reception

Box office
In the United Kingdom and Ireland, Harry Potter and the Philosopher's Stone grossed a record single day gross of £3.6million during the first day of previews, beating Toy Story 2s record. It grossed a record £3.1million for a Sunday, bringing its total to £6.7million from the previews. It broke the record for the highest-opening weekend ever, both including and excluding previews, making £16.3million with and £9.6million without previews ($13.8 million), setting a further record single day gross on the Saturday with £3.99million. It set another Sunday record with a gross of £3.6million. It had a record second weekend of £8.4 million. It remained at number one in the UK for five weeks. The film went on to make £66.1million in the UK alone, making it the country's second-highest-grossing film of all-time (after Titanic), until it was surpassed by Mamma Mia!.

In the United States and Canada, it made $32.3million on its opening day, breaking the single-day record previously held by Star Wars: Episode I – The Phantom Menace (1999). On the second day of release, the film's gross increased to $33.5million, breaking the record for biggest single day again. It made $90.3million during its first weekend, breaking the record for highest-opening weekend of all time that was previously held by The Lost World: Jurassic Park (1997). It held the record until the following May when Spider-Man (2002) made $114.8million in its opening weekend. Plus, the film broke Batman Forevers record for having the largest opening weekend for a Warner Bros. film. It would hold this record for two years until it was surpassed by The Matrix Reloaded (2003). Additionally, it shattered other opening records, surpassing Monsters, Inc. for having the biggest November opening weekend, Planet of the Apes for having the largest non-holiday opening weekend, the highest Friday gross and the biggest opening weekend of the year, The Mummy Returns for scoring the highest Saturday gross, Home Alone 2: Lost in New York (1992) for having the highest opening weekend for a Chris Columbus film and Mission: Impossible 2 (2000) for having the largest number of screenings, playing at 3,672 theaters. In just five days, it became the fastest film to approach the $100million mark. The film grossed $2.3 million in its first two days in Taiwan, giving it a worldwide opening weekend total of $107 million. The film held onto the number 1 spot at the US box office for three consecutive weekends before getting overtaken by Ocean's Eleven. The film also had the highest-grossing 5-day (Wednesday-Sunday) Thanksgiving weekend record of $82.4million, holding the title for twelve years until both The Hunger Games: Catching Fire (2013) and Frozen (2013) surpassed it with $110.1million and $94million respectively. By Christmas, it went on to become the highest-grossing film of the year, dethroning Shrek.

Similar results were achieved across the world. A week after opening in the United States, the film added 15 additional markets and set an opening week record in Germany, grossing $18.7 million. It also set opening records in Austria, Brazil, Denmark, Finland, the Netherlands, Norway, Sweden and German-speaking Switzerland. In the following weekend, after expanding to 31 countries, the film set a record overseas weekend gross of $60.9 million, including record openings in Australia, Greece, Israel, Japan ($12.5 million), New Zealand and Spain. It set another overseas weekend record with $62.3 million from 37 countries the following weekend, including record openings in France, Italy and French-speaking Switzerland. The international opening weekend record would be held until it was given to Star Wars: Episode II – Attack of the Clones (2002) a year later. During its theatrical run, the film earned $974million at the worldwide box office, $317million of that in the US and $657million elsewhere, which made it the second-highest-grossing film in history at the time, as well as the year's highest-grossing film. In addition, the film defeated Twister (1996) to become the highest-grossing Warner Bros. film of all time. It is the second-highest-grossing Harry Potter film after Deathly Hallows – Part 2. Box Office Mojo estimates that the film sold over 55.9million tickets in the US and Canada.

In August 2020, The Philosopher's Stone was re-released in several countries, including a 4K 3D restoration in China, where it earned $26.4million, for a global $1.017billion, making it the second film in the series to surpass the billion-dollar mark, after Deathly Hallows – Part 2.

Critical response
The site's critical consensus reads, "Harry Potter and the Sorcerer's Stone adapts its source material faithfully while condensing the novel's overstuffed narrative into an involving – and often downright exciting – big-screen magical caper." On Metacritic the film has a weighted average score of 65 out of 100, based on 36 critics, indicating "generally favorable reviews". Audiences surveyed by CinemaScore gave the film an average grade of "A" on an A+ to F scale.

Roger Ebert called Philosopher's Stone "a classic," giving the film four out of four stars, and particularly praising the Quidditch scenes' visual effects. Praise was echoed by both The Telegraph and Empire reviewers, with Alan Morrison of the latter naming it the film's "stand-out sequence". Brian Linder of IGN also gave the film a positive review, but concluded that it "isn't perfect, but for me it's a nice supplement to a book series that I love". Although criticising the final half-hour, Jeanne Aufmuth of Palo Alto Online stated that the film would "enchant even the most cynical of moviegoers." USA Today reviewer Claudia Puig gave the film three out of four stars, especially praising the set design and Robbie Coltrane's portrayal of Hagrid, but criticised John Williams' score and concluded "ultimately many of the book's readers may wish for a more magical incarnation." The sets, design, cinematography, effects and principal cast were all given praise from Kirk Honeycutt of The Hollywood Reporter, although he deemed John Williams' score "a great clanging, banging music box that simply will not shut up." Todd McCarthy of Variety compared the film positively with Gone with the Wind and put "The script is faithful, the actors are just right, the sets, costumes, makeup and effects match and sometimes exceed anything one could imagine." Jonathan Foreman of the New York Post recalled that the film was "remarkably faithful," to its literary counterpart as well as a "consistently entertaining if overlong adaptation."

Richard Corliss of Time magazine, considered the film a "by the numbers adaptation," criticising the pace and the "charisma-free" lead actors. CNN's Paul Tatara found that Columbus and Kloves "are so careful to avoid offending anyone by excising a passage from the book, the so-called narrative is more like a jamboree inside Rowling's head." Ed Gonzalez of Slant Magazine wished that the film had been directed by Tim Burton, finding the cinematography "bland and muggy," and the majority of the film a "solidly dull celebration of dribbling goo." Elvis Mitchell of The New York Times was highly negative about the film, saying "[the film] is like a theme park that's a few years past its prime; the rides clatter and groan with metal fatigue every time they take a curve." He also said it suffered from "a lack of imagination" and wooden characters, adding, "The Sorting Hat has more personality than anything else in the movie."

Accolades
Philosopher's Stone received three Academy Award nominations: Best Art Direction, Best Costume Design, and Best Original Score for John Williams. The film was also nominated for seven BAFTA Awards: Best British Film, Best Supporting Actor for Robbie Coltrane, Best Costume Design, Best Production Design, Best Makeup and Hair, Best Sound, and Best Visual Effects. It won a Saturn Award for Best Costume, and was nominated for eight more awards. It won other awards from the Casting Society of America and the Costume Designers Guild. It was nominated for the AFI Film Award for its special effects, and the Art Directors Guild Award for its production design. It received the Broadcast Film Critics Award for Best Family Film, and was nominated for Best Child Performance (for Daniel Radcliffe) and Best Composer. In 2005, the American Film Institute nominated the film for AFI's 100 Years of Film Scores.

References

External links

 
 
 
 

1492 Pictures films
2001 films
2001 fantasy films
2000s fantasy adventure films
2000s American films
American fantasy adventure films
British fantasy adventure films
Fiction about alchemy
Films about spirit possession
Films based on books
Harry Potter 1
Films produced by David Heyman
Films scored by John Williams
Films shot in Oxfordshire
Films shot at Warner Bros. Studios, Leavesden
Films set in England
Films set in London
Films set in Scotland
Films set in 1981
Films set in 1991
Films set in 1992
Films with screenplays by Steve Kloves
01
High fantasy films
IMAX films
Heyday Films films
Warner Bros. films
Children's fantasy films
2000s English-language films
2000s British films